Alberto González Domínguez (11 April 1904 in Buenos Aires – 14 September 1982 in Buenos Aires) was an Argentine mathematician working on analysis, probability theory and quantum field theory.

González Domínguez received his Ph.D. from the University of Buenos Aires in 1939 under the direction of Julio Rey Pastor. That same year, González Domínguez received a Guggenheim Fellowship and worked for two years with Jacob Tamarkin at Brown University. González Domínguez spent most of his career as a professor at the University of Buenos Aires.

References

External links
Full curriculum vitae including the list of publications

1904 births
1982 deaths
Mathematical analysts
Brown University alumni
University of Buenos Aires alumni
Academic staff of the University of Buenos Aires
University of California, Berkeley faculty
University of Hawaiʻi faculty
University of Illinois Chicago faculty
Argentine philologists
Argentine translators
English–Spanish translators
French–Spanish translators
German–Spanish translators
Italian–Spanish translators
Argentine writers in French
Argentine writers in German
20th-century Argentine mathematicians
20th-century philologists